Superfuzz Bigmuff is the debut EP and first major release by the Seattle grunge band Mudhoney. It was released on October 20, 1988 through record label Sub Pop. The album was later re-released in 1990 in the form of Superfuzz Bigmuff Plus Early Singles.

Album information
The album was named after two of the band's favorite guitar effects pedals: the Univox Super-Fuzz and the Electro-Harmonix Big Muff, which helped to provide the band's signature "dirty" sound.

The cover artwork is a photograph of frontman Mark Arm (left) and guitarist Steve Turner (right) performing live by photographer Charles Peterson. Other artwork on the album includes more photos of the band performing and them posing topless.

Song information
"In 'n' Out of Grace" opens with a sample of the eulogy from Peter Fonda's character in the 1966 movie The Wild Angels, saying "We wanna be free to do what we wanna do…"; the same sample was later used on Primal Scream's song "Loaded".

Reception and legacy

During initial release, the EP sold incredibly poorly (even by Sub Pop standards), however, it has since been acknowledged as one of the seminal records of the Seattle scene. In mid-2008 the EP charted at #25 on the UK Indie Album Chart, a peak for the EP, twenty years after its release.

Along with Mudhoney's second album Every Good Boy Deserves Fudge, it was included in 1001 Albums You Must Hear Before You Die. In its review, Jamie Gonzalo called it "sexy, smart, humorous and hard", as well as writing "[Mudhoney] emerged from the underground with this mischievous workout, achieving tense and dramatic musical structures with Turner's scalping guitars, Mark Arm's angry vocals, Matt Lukin's mighty bass and Dan Peters' propulsive drums." Kurt Cobain listed the EP in his top fifty albums of all time. Guitarist Turner also considered it to be Mudhoney's first official studio album, despite it being an EP initially.

Track listing

Original Release (1988)

Superfuzz Bigmuff Plus Early Singles (1990)

Deluxe Edition (2008)

On Disc 2, tracks 1–9 are live in Berlin, 10 October 1988, and tracks 10–15 are live on KCSB-FM, Santa Barbara, 16 November 1988.

Personnel
Mudhoney
Mark Arm – vocals, guitar
Steve Turner – guitar, backing vocals
Matt Lukin – bass
Dan Peters – drums

Technical personnel
Jack Endino – producer, engineer, mixing

Charts

References

External links

Superfuzz Bigmuff (Adobe Flash) at Radio3Net (streamed copy where licensed)

Mudhoney albums
1988 debut EPs
Grunge EPs
Albums produced by Jack Endino
Sub Pop EPs
Au Go Go Records EPs
Glitterhouse Records EPs